Krasnoyarsk is the name of several inhabited localities in Russia.

Modern localities
Urban localities
Krasnoyarsk, a city and the administrative center of Krasnoyarsk Krai

Rural localities
Krasnoyarsk, Orenburg Oblast, a selo in Anikhovsky Selsoviet of Adamovsky District in Orenburg Oblast

Alternative names
Krasnoyarsk, alternative name of Krasnoyarskoye, a selo in Krasnoyarsky Selsoviet of Pospelikhinsky District in Altai Krai;

See also
Krasnoyarsky (rural locality), several rural localities in Russia